Gay Shame is a movement from within the queer communities described as a radical alternative to gay mainstreaming. The movement directly posits an alternative view of gay pride events and activities which have become increasingly commercialized with corporate sponsors as well as the adoption of more sanitized, mainstream agendas to avoid offending supporters and sponsors. The Gay Shame movement has grown to embrace radical expression, counter-cultural ideologies, and avant-garde arts and artists.

Background 
Gay Shame was created as a protest of (and named in opposition to) the overcommercialization of the gay pride events. Members attack "queer assimilation" into what they perceive as oppressive societal structures. As such, its members disagree with the legalization of same-sex marriage, stating that:

History 
Gay Shame began in 1998 as an annual event in Brooklyn, New York. Held for a number of years at DUMBA, an artists' run collective center, bands such as Three Dollar Bill and Kiki and Herb and speakers such as Eileen Myles, Mattilda Bernstein Sycamore and Penny Arcade appeared at the first event, and the evening was documented by Scott Berry and released as the film Gay Shame '98. Swallow Your Pride was a zine published by the people involved in planning Gay Shame in New York. Three issues were released. The movement later spread to San Francisco, Toronto, and Sweden.

LAGAI – Queer Insurrection (formerly Lesbians and Gays Against Intervention) put such a protest in context. They wrote that the "origins of the LGBTQ movement are revolutionary […] Now, some of the same people who participated in those fabulous outpourings of anti-establishment rage tripped over each other on the way to City Hall to have their love blessed by Gavin Newsom, successor to Dan White and Dianne Feinstein, darling of the developers, persecutor of the homeless, and cause of Gay Shame getting beaten and busted by the cops on more than one occasion."

In 2002, AlterNet published a piece by queer activist Tommi Avicolli Mecca who lived in San Francisco about Gay Shame. What he wrote expressed many of the ideas of Gay Shame:

In 2009, according to an article on IndyBay, SF Gay Shame had a protest outside San Francisco's LGBT Center. A press release they put out about the event they wrote:

That same year there was an event of London's chapter of Gay Shame, which they had a so-called "indoor playground of interactive art and alternative ideas...[which was in a] club [that] shares a similar non-commercial, anti-consumerist angle...[and there were] thirty-five sideshows, 100 performance artists and 3,000 revellers."

A book titled Gay Shame was reviewed on Lambda Literary in 2010. The reviewers noted that the book looks at the origins of Gay Shame, the question of gay pride and challenges readers to "question and explore the possibility that the modern LGBT rights movement's push for acceptance, assimilation, and—they would argue—pride, results in a loss of something importantly queer as it attempts to eradicate shame...[by] exploring the ways in which pride and shame connected with race, gender and sexuality."

In 2011, Mattilda Bernstein Sycamore was interviewed by an online publication called We Who Feel Differently. Carlos Motta, the interviewer asked about how to open up spaces, and in a response, Mattilda described her work with Gay Shame:

Gay Shame was also mentioned on Mission Local, the Bay Area Reporter, writer Toshio Meronek on the Huffington Post, a radical magazine titled Slingshot, SF Weekly, Sarah Jaffe on Alternet, in a 7-page article in the Quarterly Journal of Speech and many others.

Fizzling out and the aftermath 
The San Francisco Gay Shame became a non-hierarchical direct action and radical queer collective that continued until early 2013 when it petered out. It was also "primarily responsible for the protests, mobilizations, and guerrilla tactics that shut down the city of San Francisco in response to the declaration of war on Iraq". An interview posted on the Mission Local website noted that the group began organizing in 2001, doing radical direct action with ideas like the "Goth Cry-In" which they described as a "space for basking in our sadness around the current state of LGBT politics and the horrors of the larger world." The group also said that "the current state of LGBT politics is a scramble for straight privilege" and that "things like health care ... should be available to us all ... [but that] a queer identity is about challenging institutions of domination, like marriage and the military, not becoming part of them [because] ... we would be working against traditional institutions and building connections with people that make us feel love, joy, freedom and safety—which in many cases, as we know, is the exact opposite of marriage ... [since] Gay Shame supports gender self-determination in all its manifestations."

Their website described themselves as committed to "a queer extravaganza that brings direct action to astounding levels of theatricality [that rejects a] commercialized gay identity that denies the intrinsic links between queer struggle and challenging power ... counter[ing] the self-serving 'values' of gay consumerism and ... fighting the rabid assimilationist monster with a devastating mobilization of queer brilliance." Despite this, in 2012, according to writer Toshio Meronek, a criticism of the "corporatization of Pride events has officially gone viral ... [and] that Pride actually started as a day of political action called Christopher Street Liberation Day." At one point, after Don't Ask Don't Tell was repealed, Gay Shame put out a flier declaring: "No Gays in the Military! We need you on the streets. Keeping the status quo in check and on fire."

After the end of the last chapter of Gay Shame, there were some reflections on the movement as a whole. One of the main organizers, Mattilda Bernstein Sycamore of this group told the San Francisco Bay Guardian that:

This is similar to what she said in a radio show in late October 2012 called Horizontal Power Hour.

In June 2013, an article on White Rose Reader added to this, noting that: "Starting in 1998, these “Gay Shame” events promoted counter-cultural ideologies and radical expression...some have picked up on this: a blog popped up recently to demand Gay Shame, started by a 48-year old queer male DJ."

Re-emergence 
In September 2013, Gay Shame SF or San Francisco Gay Shame, re-emerged. Gay Shame SF describes themselves as a 'Virus in the System," declaring a "new queer activism...to counter the self-serving "values" of gay consumerism and the increasingly hypocritical left." Organizationally, Gay Shame SF is consensus based, meaning everyone has to agree on decisions before they proceed and that they will make sure everyone is fully informed on the actions that are going to occur. When any member of the group speaks to the press, they will identify as 'Mary' so no one is seen as a leader, incorrectly identified and so that anonymity can be preserved.

Most recently, Gay Shame SF has attracted attention for its prison abolition and anti-gentrification organizing. In 2014, six members of Gay Shame were arrested for protesting a "prison-themed" pride party hosted by Kink.com. In an open letter co-signed by queer abolition leaders Miss Major and Angela Davis, Gay Shame demanded that Kink.com change the party's theme, and "not use themes of arrest and incarceration... in promoting your event." In 2015, a series of "anti-tech" fliers posted by Gay Shame in the Mission District, San Francisco, demanded 'Brogrammers' leave the neighborhood and implied violence.

Additionally, other chapters have emerged as well. In around May 2013, Gay Shame San Diego emerged, describing itself on a Facebook page as being "created as a protest to the overcommercialization of pride events and opposes queer assimilation." This Facebook page has covered topics ranging from same-sex marriage, Lou Reed, and gay pride. Around the same time, a tumblr of the organization popped up as well repeating the same description on their Facebook page and it has been around ever since. Their tumblr currently has reposted material written by Gay Shame SF, criticized capitalism, and discussed topics such as queer and trans liberation..

Criticism 
Due to the opposition to mainstream LGBTQ culture, some have criticized Gay Shame. Another criticism, from a queer perspective, while praising the group in certain ways, commented: "...it is difficult for the group to wholly remove themselves from the overarching structure as their ideology demands... By removing individual names, and by extent, individual identities within the group, Gay Shame conforms to the very commercialization it seeks to fight against."

Academic conference 
An academic conference at the University of Michigan Ann Arbor occurred in March, 2003. Supposedly, during that weekend, there was friction between the activists and the academics, growing out of different strategies, and the activists' claim that the academics didn't do enough to acknowledge their power and class privilege, and to share more of that with the activists. A professor from the University of Texas adds to this account, reviewing a book called Gay Shame:

Events 
There have also been annual themed events titled "Gay Shame and Lesbian Weakness" in London, England, associated with the club night Duckie run by Simon Casson and Amy Lamé. Although documentation about when the first event happened is hard to come by, the event was occurring annually by 1998, if not earlier. The 2004 event was billed as "Now in its 9th great year." The event includes performance art and queer-bash make-overs and is also referred to as The Annual Festival of Homosexual Misery. The 2009 event has been announced as the last. But, since Gay Shame SF has re-emerged, new events are likely to happen as well.

Duckie Gay Shame Themes 
2004 Homosexual Misery. It's a nightclub. It's a theatre event. It's a rip-off.
2005 Homosexual Misery. London's inverted underbelly prove that Gay ain't nothing to be proud of.
2006 Euroshame for EuroPride, the booths and shows themed as different European countries.
2007 Cancelled due to Arts Council England funding diverted to the Olympics.
2008 Masculinity, betting, boxing, trucker fun.
2009 Femininity.
2015 National Borders (the plight of LGBTQ asylum seekers).

From 2001 to 2004, there were Shame events in Stockholm, Sweden. Gay Shame SF meets every Saturday at the Muddy Waters cafe.

See also

References 

Counterculture
LGBT criticism of marriage
LGBT pride
LGBT anarchism